Mikołajki Pomorskie  is a village in Sztum County, Pomeranian Voivodeship, in northern Poland. It is the seat of the gmina (administrative district) called Gmina Mikołajki Pomorskie.

Before 1772 the area was part of Kingdom of Poland, 1772-1945 Prussia and Germany. For the history of the region, see History of Pomerania.

The village has a population of 1,500.

References

Villages in Sztum County